Miklós Szinetár (born 8 February 1932) is a Hungarian film director and screenwriter. He directed more than 20 films between 1962 and 1991. His 1979 film The Fortress was entered into the 11th Moscow International Film Festival.

Selected filmography
 Háry János (1965)
 The Fortress (1979)

References

External links

1932 births
Living people
Hungarian film directors
Hungarian screenwriters
Male screenwriters
Hungarian male writers
Writers from Budapest